Henri Rochereau (25 March 1908, in Chantonnay, Vendée – 25 January 1999, in Paris) was a French politician and European Commissioner.

Henri was the son of Victor Rochereau, a National Assembly of France député (deputy) for the Vendée department (1914–1942). Henri worked as a solicitors clerk and later in an exporting business.

In the 1988 French presidential election, he supported the right-wing National Front candidate Jean-Marie Le Pen.

Offices 
 From 1949 to 1959 he was a member of the Senate of France for the Vendée department and a council leader for the canton of Les Essarts
 From May 1959 to August 1961 Minister for Agriculture in the government of Michel Debré
 From 1962 to 1970 he was Overseas Development Commissioner in the second Hallstein Commission, and from 1967, in the Rey Commission
 From 1970 to 1986 he was President of the association of Large French Ports

Notes

|-

|-

|-

1908 births
1999 deaths
French European Commissioners
French Ministers of Agriculture
French Senators of the Fourth Republic
People from Vendée
Senators of Vendée
European Commissioners 1967–1970